Khater is a surname. Notable people with the surname include:

Akram Fouad Khater, professor of history at North Carolina State University
Lahad Khater (1881–1975), Lebanese journalist and writer
Lama Khater, Palestinian journalist and writer
Mohammad Khater (born 1989), Jordanian professional footballer
Mohammed bin Khater Al Khater, Qatari diplomat, Qatar's ambassador to India
Salih Khater, British man convicted of murder in the 2018 Westminster car attack
Subait Khater (born 1980), retired Emirati footballer
Suleiman Khater (1961–1986), Egyptian soldier who committed the Ras Burqa massacre in 1985
Toufic Abou Khater (1934–2020), Monaco-based Palestinian/Lebanese billionaire businessman

See also
Al Khater, prestigious family in the Middle East
Nazlet Khater, archeological site in Upper Egypt that has yielded evidence of early human culture
Boneh-ye Khater, a village in Howmeh Rural District, in the Central District of Deylam County, Bushehr Province, Iran
Givad Khater, a village in Hur Rural District, in the Central District of Faryab County, Kerman Province, Iran
Gol Khater, a village in Howmeh-ye Sarpol Rural District, in the Central District of Sarpol-e Zahab County, Kermanshah Province, Iran

de:Khater
it:Khater